An indirect presidential election was held on 6 September 2008 in Pakistan. The Electoral College of Pakistan – a joint sitting of the Senate, National Assembly and Provincial Assemblies – elected a new president after the resignation of President Pervez Musharraf. As required by the constitution, Muhammad Mian Soomro (in his position as Chairman of the Senate of Pakistan) automatically became acting president on 18 August 2008, upon the resignation of Musharraf. The constitution required that a new president be elected by Parliament within 30 days; Soomro was considered loyal to Musharraf, and it was considered certain that he would be replaced in that election.

Composition of the Electoral College
The Electoral College of Pakistan is formed by a joint sitting of the six leading political bodies in Pakistan:
 the Senate of Pakistan,
 the National Assembly of Pakistan,
 the Provincial Assembly of the Punjab,
 the Provincial Assembly of Sindh,
 the Provincial Assembly of Balochistan and
 the Provincial Assembly of Khyber Pakhtunkhwa

So that each province has an equal vote, all provincial assemblies are given exactly 65 votes in the electoral college. This mean that the each member of the Punjab Assembly has 65/370 = 0.176 votes, each member of the Sindh Assembly has 65/166 = 0.392 votes, each member of the Khyber Pakhtunkhwa Assembly has 65/124 = 0.524 votes and each member of the Balochistan Assembly has 65/65 = 1 vote.

The political composition of these bodies at the time of the election was:

Candidates
Nominations closed on Tuesday 26 August.
 On 18 August the ruling Pakistan Peoples Party co-chairmen, Bilawal Bhutto Zardari and Asif Ali Zardari, said that the next president should come from the PPP as they had the largest number of seats in parliament.
 On 19 August the ruling coalition discussed the presidency and was reported to have considered five candidates:
Asif Ali Zardari PPP co-chairman
Mahmood Khan Achakzai, leader of the Pakhtun-khwa Milli Awami Party
Aftab Shaban Mirani, former PPP Chief Minister of Sindh
Fehmida Mirza, PPP speaker of the National Assembly of Pakistan from Sindh
Faryal Talpur, PPP Nazim (mayor) of a city Sindh and sister of Asif Ali Zardari
 On 20 August the opposition Muttahida Qaumi Movement – which backed Musharraf – said the President should not come from Punjab and backed Pakistan Peoples Party leader Asif Ali Zardari – who is from Sindh – for president.
 On 21 August the Pakistan Muslim League (N) was reported to have suggested three people for the presidency:
Fakhruddin G. Ebrahim, a lawyer
Ataullah Mengal, a nationalist leader from Baluchistan, and
Saeeduzzaman Siddiqui, a former Chief Justice of the Supreme Court of Pakistan
 On 22 August, the PPP officially nominated Zardari as its candidate.
 On 23 August, the PML(N) said it preferred an independent president. However, PML(N) head Sharif said he would support Zardari if they agreed to reduce the powers of the Presidency and reinstate the judges sacked after the 2007 Pakistani state of emergency
 On 24 August the Awami National Party said it would support Zardari.
 On 25 August:
 The PML-N pulled out of the coalition government and said it would support Saeeduzzaman Siddiqui for the presidency, and emphasised that the Presidency should remain a neutral office as it represents the Federating Units, Justice Siddiqui was not part of the PML(N) or any other political party.
 Imran Khan, the former cricketer and leader of the Tehreek-e-Insaf party said Zardari should not become president as he was "such a corrupt man".
 The Jamiat Ulema-e-Islam-Fazl party said it would support Zardari if the government agreed to end the military operation in Bajaur.
 The Pakistan Muslim League (F) said it would neither support nor oppose Zardari.
 The All Pakistan Minorities Alliance said it supported Zardari.
 On 26 August the PML(Q) nominated Senator Mushahid Hussain as its candidate.
 On 28 August the Election Commission of Pakistan announced that five people had been validly nominated as candidates:
 Asif Ali Zardari, PPP
 Saeeduzzaman Siddiqui, supported by the PML-N and Jamaat-e-Islami Pakistan;
 Mushahid Hussain, PML-Q
 Faryal Talpur, covering candidate for Zardari
 Roedad Khan, covering candidate for Justice Siddiqui
 On 30 August, Talpur and Roedad withdrew their candidacies.
 On 31 August the Pakistan Peoples Party (Sherpao) declared its support for Zardari.

Result

|-
! style="background-color:#E9E9E9;text-align:left;vertical-align:top;" |Candidate
! style="background-color:#E9E9E9;text-align:left;vertical-align:top;" |Main supporting party 
! style="background-color:#E9E9E9;text-align:center;" |Senate
! style="background-color:#E9E9E9;text-align:center;" |National Assembly
! style="background-color:#E9E9E9;text-align:center;" |Punjab*
! style="background-color:#E9E9E9;text-align:center;" |Sindh* 
! style="background-color:#E9E9E9;text-align:center;" |Balochistan
! style="background-color:#E9E9E9;text-align:center;" |NWFP*
! style="background-color:#E9E9E9;text-align:center;" |Total
|-
| style="text-align:left;" | Asif Ali Zardari 
| style="text-align:left;" | Pakistan Peoples Party
| style="text-align:right;" colspan=2 | 241
| style="text-align:right;" | 20
| style="text-align:right;" | 63
| style="text-align:right;" | 40
| style="text-align:right;" | 45
| style="text-align:right;" | 409
  |-
| style="text-align:left;" | Saeeduzzaman Siddiqui 
| style="text-align:left;" | Pakistan Muslim League (N) & Jamaat-e-Islami Pakistan;
| style="text-align:right;" colspan=2 | 142
 | style="text-align:right;" |40
 | style="text-align:right;" |0
 | style="text-align:right;" |9
 | style="text-align:right;" |25
 | style="text-align:right;" | 216
|-
| style="text-align:left;" | Mushahid Hussain Syed
| style="text-align:left;" | Pakistan Muslim League (Q)
| style="text-align:right;" colspan=2 | 31
 | style="text-align:right;" |3
 | style="text-align:right;" |0
 | style="text-align:right;" |7
 | style="text-align:right;" |2
 | style="text-align:right;" |44
|-
| colspan=9 style="text-align:left;" | *  Pro-rated to 65 votes
|-
| colspan=9 style="text-align:left;" |Source: Dawn
|}

Asif Ali Zardari was elected President of Pakistan, as Chief election commissioner Qazi Mohammad Farooq announced that "Asif Ali Zardari secured 241 votes out of the 426 valid votes polled in the parliament," In Sindh, Zardari had 62 of the 65 electoral votes while his 2 main opponents, got zero vote; in Khyber Pakhtunkhwa Zardari got 56 votes against 25 by Siddiqui and one by Hussain; in Baluchistan, 49 votes while Siddiqui and Hussain got 5 and 2 respectively. BBC reported that Zardari "won 419 votes, far more than the 372 votes that would have guaranteed him victory." The New York Times said that Zardari would be sworn in "as soon as Saturday night or as late as Monday or Tuesday, diplomats and officials said."

The new president, who obtains the largest number of votes, will serve for 5 years as Pakistan's 11th since 1956, when the country became a republic, excluding acting presidents. Voting was in progress at the Parliament House, while the Senate members finished casting their votes, amid the death of 12 people, after a suicide car bomber blasted a security checkpoint on the outskirts of Peshawar.

Violaion of rules in Khyber Pakhtunkhwa
A number of MPAs of Khyber Pakhtunkhwa Assembly including the Chief Minister violated the secret ballot by displaying the stamped ballot papers in the presidential elections. So these votes have to be subtracted from the vote count.

Reaction 
Pakistan Peoples Party activists in Pakistan held rallies and distributed sweets when the results were announced. The main opposition party, PML-N, said it was the "success of the democratic process in the country" but said he should resign as PPP co-chairman, as the President has traditionally been apolitical, and to transfer Presidential powers back to parliament. The newspaper 'Dawn' described Zardari as the most controversial President of Pakistan at the time of his election, and urged him to "dispel the impression of a political wheeler-dealer and rise to the requirements of statesmanship". The Regional Times of Sindh said Zardari had one of the stiffest jobs in the world as leader of the world's only nuclear-armed Islamic country, a frontline war on terror state and facing "growing militancy" and "crippling economic woes". However, they said his "years of suffering have made him wiser and headstrong" and he has "displayed great acumen and maturity since returning to the political scene". Privately, the Pakistan military, bureaucracy and business elite were said to be "aghast" at the result given past corruption allegations.

The United States Secretary of State welcomed Zardari's victory, praising his "emphasis on fighting terrorism" and "very strong words of friendship and alliance with the United States".

See also 
 Elections in Pakistan

References

External links
Election Commission of Pakistan 

Presidential election
2008
2008 in Pakistani politics
September 2008 events in Pakistan